Rafael Nadal was the defending champion, but chose not to participate due to a knee injury.

Andy Murray won in the final 7–5, 6–4, against James Blake, becoming the first British champion at Queen's since 1938.

Seeds
The top eight seeds receive a bye into the second round.

Draw

Finals

Top half

Section 1

Section 2

Bottom half

Section 3

Section 4

External links
Main Draw
Qualifying Draw

Singles